The 1965 American Football League season was the sixth regular season of the AFL.

The season also saw a change of television address as the games moved from ABC to NBC.

The season ended when the Buffalo Bills defeated the San Diego Chargers in the AFL Championship game. The next season, the AFL would join the NFL to form the AFL-NFL World Championship game, known today as the Super Bowl.

Division Races
The AFL had 8 teams, grouped into two divisions.  Each team would play a home-and-away game against the other 7 teams in the league for a total of 14 games, and the best team in the Eastern Division would play against the best in the Western Division in a championship game.  If there was a tie in the standings at top of either division, a one-game playoff would be held to determine the division winner.

There was little drama in either of the AFL's division races in 1965.  The Bills led the Eastern Division from start to finish, ending five games ahead of the 5–8–1 Jets.  In the Western Division, San Diego had three potential wins cancelled out when they were tied by Kansas City (10–10), Boston (13–13) and Buffalo (20–20), but their 9–2–3 finish (.818) was well ahead of Oakland's 8–5–1 record (.615).

Regular season

Results

Standings

Playoffs

Stadium changes
 The Houston Oilers moved from Jeppensen Stadium to Rice Stadium

Coaching changes
Denver Broncos: Mac Speedie began his first full season. He replaced Jack Faulkner after four games into the 1964 season.
Houston Oilers: Sammy Baugh was fired and replaced by Hugh Taylor.

External links
Football Database

 
American Football League seasons